Juncus leiospermus is an uncommon species of rush known by the common name Red Bluff dwarf rush. It is endemic to California, where it is known only from the Central Valley and adjacent Sierra Nevada foothills to the east.

Description
Juncus leiospermus is a plant of vernal pools and other wet seasonal depressions in the local habitat. The stems are surrounded by a few thready leaves.

The inflorescence is a single cluster of several reddish flowers atop the small stems.

References

External links
Jepson Manual Treatment — Juncus leiospermus
Juncus leiospermus - Photo gallery

leiospermus
Endemic flora of California
Flora of the Sierra Nevada (United States)
Natural history of the Central Valley (California)
Plants described in 1948